Allan D. "Al" DeKruif (born February 3, 1956) is an American politician and a former member of the Minnesota Senate in which he represented District 25.

Politics
Allan DeKruif represented District 25 which included:
Le Sueur
Rice
Scott
Sibley counties in the south central part of the state.

DeKruif was first elected in 2010. He was a member of the Education, the Jobs and Economic Growth, and the Transportation committees. His special legislative concerns included the state's business climate and building the state budget with long term growth in mind. On May 21, 2011, he joined the Senate Republican Majority in voting for a constitutional amendment to define marriage as a legal bond exclusively between a man and woman.

Legislative Committees
Dekruif was a member of the following legislative committees:
Education, Member
Jobs and Economic Growth, Member
Transportation, Member

Information
As a  Republican, he is a consultant and owner of DeKruif Enterprises, Inc., This company not only handles the planning and permitting of super load moves across America, but it also runs the moving of large electric transformers into nuclear and coal-fired power plants and substations. He is also the owner of Sakatah Trail Resort in Madison Lake. He is a member of the Minnesota Patriot Guard, and served as a ride captain for two years.

Family
DeKruif is married to Carol, and together they have two children named Jason and Melissa.

Education
DeKruif attended the University of Minnesota in Waseca.

Organizations
Al DeKruif has been a member of the following organizations:
Chair of the Board of Trustees, Lutheran Church
Ride Captain, Minnesota Patriot Guard

References

External links

 Senator Al DeKruif Web Page
 Project Vote Smart - Senator Al DeKruif Profile
 Al DeKruif Campaign Web Site
 Sakatah Trail Resort Web Site

1956 births
Living people
People from Blue Earth County, Minnesota
University of Minnesota Waseca alumni
Republican Party Minnesota state senators
American Lutherans
21st-century American politicians